Arakelov is a Russian masculine surname of Armenian origin, its feminine counterpart is Arakelova. It may refer to

Sergey Arakelov (born 1957), Russian weightlifter
Suren Arakelov (born 1947), Soviet mathematician

Russian-language surnames